The Castille Paris is a 5 star hotel in Paris, France owned by the Starhotels group and marketed by Preferred Hotels and Resorts. The hotel is located in the heart of the city, between Place de la Concorde and Place Vendôme, adjacent to Chanel's headquarters. The hotel has 108 rooms (of which 21 are suites) and the hotel's meeting rooms seat 70 people.

References

External links
 Official website

Hotels in Paris
Buildings and structures in the 1st arrondissement of Paris